Didymium difforme is a species of slime mold belonging to the family Didymiidae.

References

Myxogastria